The President of Cantabria, according to the Autonomy Statute of Cantabria, presides over the Government of Cantabria, directs its activities, coordinates the Administration of the autonomous community, designates and separates the regional ministers, and holds the supreme representation of the autonomous community and ordinary representation of the State in Cantabria. The president is elected by the Parliament of Cantabria among its members, and is appointed by the King of Spain.

The Parliament elects him or her by absolute majority in first session or by simple majority in subsequent. Between each session at least forty eight hours have to pass. If two months after the constitution of the Parliament there hasn't been elected a candidate, it is dissolved and there is another call for elections.

Election and investiture 
The President of Cantabria is chosen by the Parliament of Cantabria after the autonomic elections of Cantabria, in which ones, people votes for the political parties that will form the Parliament.

According with the established in the third point of the article 17 of the Organic Law 8/1981, of December 30, of the Statute of Autonomy of Cantabria:

Functions and powers
The functions of the President of Cantabria are established in the articles 17 and 23 of the Organic Law 8/1981, of December 30, of the Statute of Autonomy of Cantabria:

Also, in the second point of the article 22 is given the unique authority to the President of Cantabria to raise a matter of confidence:

Cessation, matter of confidence and constructive vote of no confidence 

According to the article 22 of the Organic Law 8/1981, of December 30, of the Statute of Autonomy of Cantabria:

List of Presidents

Presidents of Interprovincial Council of Santander, Palencia and Burgos

Presidents of Cantabria

See also 
 Parliament of Cantabria
 Government of Cantabria
 Politics of Spain
 Political divisions of Spain
 Nationalities and regions of Spain

References

 
Politicians from Cantabria